Conasprella comatosa, common name comatose cone, is a species of sea snail, a marine gastropod mollusk in the family Conidae, the cone snails and their allies.

Like all species within the genus Conasprella, these snails are predatory and venomous. They are capable of "stinging" humans, therefore live ones should be handled carefully or not at all.

Description
The size of the shell varies between 20 mm and 60 mm.

Distribution
This species occurs in the Pacific Ocean off Japan, the Philippines, Northwest Australia, New Caledonia and the Solomon Islands.

References

 Pilsbry, H.A. 1904. New Japanese marine Mollusca: Pelecypoda. Proceedings of the Academy of Natural Sciences, Philadelphia 56: 550–561, pls 39–41
 Schepman, M.M. 1913. Toxoglossa. 384–396 in Weber, M. & de Beaufort, L.F. (eds). The Prosobranchia, Pulmonata and Opisthobranchia Tectibranchiata, Tribe Bullomorpha, of the Siboga Expedition. Monograph 49. Siboga Expeditie 32(2)
 Fulton, H.C. 1936. Molluscan Notes 6. Proceedings of the Malacological Society of London 22: 7–8 
 Filmer R.M. (2001). A Catalogue of Nomenclature and Taxonomy in the Living Conidae 1758 – 1998. Backhuys Publishers, Leiden. 388pp
 Tucker J.K. (2009). Recent cone species database. 4 September 2009 Edition
 Puillandre N., Meyer C.P., Bouchet P. & Olivera B.M. (2011) Genetic divergence and geographic variation in the deep-water Conus orbignyi complex (Mollusca: Conoidea). Zoologica Scripta 40(4): 350–363.
 Severns M. (2011) Shells of the Hawaiian Islands – The Sea Shells. Conchbooks, Hackenheim. 564 pp.
  Puillandre N., Duda T.F., Meyer C., Olivera B.M. & Bouchet P. (2015). One, four or 100 genera? A new classification of the cone snails. Journal of Molluscan Studies. 81: 1–23.

External links
 The Conus Biodiversity website

comatosa
Gastropods of Australia
Molluscs of Japan
Molluscs of the Philippines
Gastropods described in 1904